Niklas Jokelainen (born 30 March 2000) is a Finnish professional footballer who plays for AC Oulu as a forward.

Career
He senior career began in 2015, after 14-year old Jokelainen signed a professional pre-contract in December 2014. At the age of 15 and one month, Jokelainen became the youngest player to play in the AC Oulu shirt when he made his debut in February 2015. He played in six Ykkönen matches during the 2015 and 2016 seasons, before moving to the Academy of Stoke City in the summer 2016.

In August 2017, Jokelainen returned to Finland and joined FC Ilves, who played in the Veikkausliiga. He made his debut in the Veikkausliiga on April 8, 2018. In the 2018 season, Jokelainen played a total of 18 league matches and one Europa League qualifier. He scored his first league goal on April 25, 2018 against the VPS.

On 13 November 2018, RoPS announced that they had signed Jokelainen for the 2019 season. Jokelainen played a total of 20 league matches and scored two goals in them in his first season. He also played in both RoPS qualifiers for the Europa League. Jokelainen returned to AC Oulu for the 2020 season, who played in the Ykkönen.

References

External links
RoPS profile

2000 births
Living people
Finnish footballers
AC Oulu players
Stoke City F.C. players
FC Ilves players
Rovaniemen Palloseura players
Veikkausliiga players
Ykkönen players
Association football forwards
Finnish expatriate footballers
Finnish expatriate sportspeople in England
Expatriate footballers in England
Sportspeople from Oulu